Tillamook Cheddar (January 17, 1999 - January 29, 2014; Tillie for short) was a Jack Russell terrier dog from Greenwich, Connecticut, who acquired a reputation as an artist. She had work on display at the National Arts Club, collaborating on pieces that were shown with human artists such as Tom Sachs and Dirk Westphal.

Background
A 16-pound (7.25 kg) Jack Russell terrier with a white coat and brown and black markings on her face, she was named for Tillamook Cheddar, a brand of cheese produced in the U.S. state of Oregon. She lived in the Clinton Hill neighborhood of Brooklyn, New York, with her owner, F. Bowman Hastie III, a freelance writer and editor. Hastie, who grew up in Oregon, served as her agent, publicist, and manager.

Hastie received Tillamook Cheddar as a 30th birthday gift from his mother, picking her out of a litter in Greenwich, Connecticut. Hastie first noted what he thought were her artistic inclinations when she was six months of age; while he was sitting on his couch writing on a legal pad, she jumped up and began scratching at the pad. Believing that she was attempting to communicate in some way, he affixed a sheet of carbon paper to the pad and she scratched her first image.

Reception of work
In 2004 Parade Magazine described her as "Best New Artist" and in 2005 The Art Newspaper said she was "the most successful living animal painter".

Art critic Michael Mills of the New Times Broward-Palm Beach said:
Mills also quoted Jerry Saltz of The Village Voice who called the work a "sham".

Appearances and exhibitions
In 2007, she painted in a public multimedia event called "Tillie Jazz," in collaboration with a live jazz trio (pianist Dred Scott, tenor saxophonist Bill McHenry, and drummer RJ Miller).

Tillamook Cheddar has appeared on CNN Sunday Morning, with hosts Anderson Cooper and Catherine Callaway (September 29, 2002).

On November 30, 2006, Tillamook Cheddar (presented as "Tillie the Canine Artist") appeared as a featured guest on Late Night with Conan O'Brien.

On December 1, 2006, Sean Cole of NPR's Studio 360 program mentioned her as an animal artist.

See also
Congo (chimpanzee)
List of individual dogs

References

Books
F. Bowman Hastie III (2006). Portrait of the Dog as a Young Artist: Art from Scratch, By the World's Preeminent Canine Painter. Seattle, Washington: Sasquatch Books. 
Packard, Mary (2003). Talented Animals: A Chapter Book. Children's Press.

Articles
Szabo, Julia. "Picture this! Tillie's Artistic Talent Brings Her Star-Status." New York Post, September 26, 2004.
Ballo, Kate. "These Paintings Fetch Up to $2000 (And They were Painted By a Dog)." New York Dog, January 2006.

External links
Tillamook Cheddar official site

Visual arts by animals
Individual dogs
Culture of Brooklyn
1999 animal births
2014 animal deaths